Encanto/Central Avenue (also known as Heard Museum) is a light rail station on Valley Metro Rail in uptown Phoenix, Arizona, United States.  It is the ninth stop southbound and the twenty-first stop northbound on the initial 20 mile starter line. The station is located on Central Avenue north of Encanto Boulevard directly in front of the Tapestry on Central condominium complex. The Heard Museum is located across the street from this station.

Station art
The Central/Encanto station features art by Jamex & Einar de la Torre from San Diego, California.

Ridership

Notable places nearby
 Heard Museum
 U.S. Federal Building
 St. Mary's High School
 Monterey Park
 Willo Historic District

References

External links
 Valley Metro map

Valley Metro Rail stations in Phoenix, Arizona
Railway stations in the United States opened in 2008
2008 establishments in Arizona